The Tri-Cities of Virginia (also known as the Tri-City area or the Appomattox Basin) is an area in the Greater Richmond Region which includes the three independent cities of  Petersburg, Colonial Heights, and Hopewell and portions of the adjoining counties of Chesterfield, Dinwiddie, and Prince George in south-central Virginia. Other unincorporated communities located in the Tri-Cities area include Ettrick, Fort Lee, and City Point, the latter formerly a historic incorporated town which was annexed to become part of the City of Hopewell.

Regional description
The Appomattox has its confluence with the James River near historic City Point in Hopewell. The applicable Metropolitan Statistical Area for the Tri-Cities area is the Richmond, VA MSA, which includes Richmond and counties generally to the north of the Tri-Cities area. Economic diversity is typical of the entire Richmond-Petersburg region, and helps to insulate it from hardship due to economic fluctuation in particular sectors of the economy.The tri-city region has been undergoing a opioid epidemic for several years now as well. The region's central location also allows it to benefit from growth in other regions of Virginia and the state as a whole.

Transportation in the Tri-Cities

Interstate 95 is the major north-south highway. Interstate 85 and Interstate 295 also pass through, as does U.S. Route 1 (The Boulevard in Colonial Heights), U.S. Route 301, State Route 144 (Temple Avenue). Major east-west highways are  U.S. Route 460, State Route 10, and State Route 36.

Major river crossings include the Martin Luther King Memorial Bridge and the twin Charles Hardaway Marks Bridges across the Appomattox River, and the Varina-Enon Bridge and the Benjamin Harrison Memorial Bridge across the James River.

Amtrak passenger railroad service is provided with a station at Ettrick, an unincorporated community in Chesterfield County adjacent to both  Petersburg and Colonial Heights. Freight railroad service is provided by both CSX Transportation and Norfolk Southern Corporation.

Bus Transportation is provided by the Petersburg Area Transit . There are nine routes serving parts of Petersburg, Ettrick, Colonial Heights (Southpark Mall area), Fort Lee, and Prince George County that all have their intersection in Old Town. PAT and GRTC together provide express bus service between Richmond and Petersburg, with some express buses stopping at John Tyler Community College in Chester.

Media 

Periodicals include:
 The Richmond Times-Dispatch, local daily paper for Richmond.
 The Progress-Index, local daily paper for the Tri-Cities and Sussex located in Petersburg.
 The Colonial Voice, a weekly for Colonial Heights.
 The Fort Lee Traveller, for U.S. Army post and headquarters Fort Lee.
 The Chester Village News, for Chesterfield County.
 The Hopewell News & Patriot, (defunct) for Hopewell, Prince George County and Colonial Heights.

Radio and television stations are the same as those listed for Richmond, Virginia.

Culture
Like many cities in the United States, the city of Petersburg is a city that has sought to revitalize  its downtown area by promoting its arts scene. In the 1990s and 2000s, several areas including the "Old Town" area has seen increased remodeling and renovating of old, abandoned buildings into loft apartments and eclectic restaurants. In 2004, the Shockoe Bottom Arts group moved from downtown Richmond to downtown Petersburg due to lower real estate prices there. Several antique shops, a former train station, and a theater are the centerpiece of "old town" See Also: Petersburg

Similarly, Hopewell has commenced a revitalization projects with renovations of their harbor complex, "Town Triangle," and the historic Beacon Theatre.

Other cultural productions in the tri-cities occur at local colleges and at the Fort Lee Playhouse on Fort Lee.

Education
Educational facilities in the region are listed as follows: 
K-12
 Appomattox Regional Governor's School for the Arts And Technology
 Chesterfield Public Schools
 Hopewell Public Schools 
 Petersburg Public Schools 
 Prince George Public Schools 
 Dinwiddie Public Schools 
 Colonial Heights Public Schools 
Colleges and Universities
 Richard Bland College (Petersburg)
 Virginia State University (Ettrick)
 John Tyler Community College (Chester)
 Army Logistics Management College (Fort Lee)

Infrastructure
The area is served by several hospitals, John Randolph Medical Center (a HCA Hospital) (Hopewell),  Hiram Davis Medical Center (Acute Care) (Petersburg), Southside Regional Medical Center (Petersburg), and Poplar Springs Hospital (psychiatric facility) (Petersburg).

Southpark Mall
Southpark Mall is a large regional shopping mall in the tri-cities area. Built in 1988 at the intersection of State Route 144 and Interstate 95, the mall complex has expanded significantly to include many big box retailers. While the mall itself is located in Colonial Heights, Virginia, other development has increased throughout the tri-cities.

Fort Lee
Fort Lee is a United States Army post and headquarters of the U.S. Army Combined Arms Support Command (CASCOM), U.S. Army Quartermaster Center and School (QMCS), the Army Logistics Management College (ALMC) and the U.S. Defense Commissary Agency (DeCA). A United States Army Forces Command (FORSCOM) unit, the 49th Quartermaster Group (Petroleum and Water), is stationed here.  Fort Lee also hosts two Army museums, the U.S. Army Quartermaster Museum and the U.S. Army Women's Museum.  The fort is named for Confederate General Robert E. Lee. Military personnel make up a significant presence in the tri-cities area.

Federal prisons
The Tri-cities also is home to a federal prison complex called the Petersburg Federal Correctional Complex. It consists of medium and low security Federal Correctional Institutions known respectively as FCI Petersburg Medium and FCI Petersburg Low. Despite its name, the address of the Petersburg Federal Correctional Complex is actually in Prince George County.  In addition, there is United States Probation Office near FCI – Petersburg, in Colonial Heights, Virginia, and the two agencies enjoy a supportive relationship.

Industries
 Puddledock Sand & Gravel, in Prince George County, Virginia is a quarry that has made significant alteration of the landscape along the Appomattox River and State Route 144 (Temple Avenue). The quarry is currently owned by Vulcan Materials Company and quarries natural sand as well as asphalt and  concrete aggregates for gravel. Hopewell also is known for a number of chemical manufacturing plants.

Civil War history
Many sites in the tri-cities area have names reflecting the region's role in the American Civil War. A major logistics base for the Union Army was located at City Point and the City Point Railroad  that enabled the siege of Petersburg is still in operation today. The history of the Battle of the Crater can be viewed in Petersburg National Battlefield Park and is commemorated in nearby 'Crater Road and the Fort Lee entry "Mahone Gate" named after Brigadier General William Mahone, the hero of the Battle of the Crater during the Siege of Petersburg in 1864.  Fort Lee itself is named after Confederate Civil War hero Robert E. Lee.

References

External links
 Area Map with Google Maps

Regions of Virginia
Tri-Cities of Virginia
Tri-Cities of Virginia
Tri-Cities of Virginia
Tri-Cities of Virginia
Tri-Cities of Virginia
Tri-Cities of Virginia
Greater Richmond Region
Tri-Cities of Virginia